This is a list of lighthouses in Chile from Robinson Crusoe Island to Bahía Corral.

Robinson Crusoe Island

Talcahuano

Bahía San Vicente

Bahía de Coronel

Bahía de Lota

Lebu

Isla Mocha

Bahía Corral
[[File:Faro Morro Niebla.JPG|thumb|right|250px|Lighthouse in Niebla, Chile at the Valdivia River]]

See also
List of fjords, channels, sounds and straits of Chile
List of islands of Chile

References
  List of Lights, Radio Aids and Fog Signals: The West Coast of North and South America...'' National Geospatial-Intelligence Agency. 2013. pp. 20–60.

NGA1328-NGA1540
NGA1328-NGA1540
Lighthouses NGA1328-NGA1540